Winston Churchill, who served in a multitude of ministerial positions between 1908 and 1952, including as Prime Minister of the United Kingdom from 1940 to 1945 and again from 1951 to 1955, and as a Member of Parliament (MP) for five different constituencies between 1900 and 1964, except for a break in 1922–24.

Parliamentary elections

1899 Oldham by-election

1900 general election, Oldham

1906 general election, Manchester North West

1908 Manchester North West by-election

1908 Dundee by-election

January 1910 general election, Dundee

December 1910 general election, Dundee

1917 Dundee by-election

1918 general election, Dundee

1922 general election, Dundee

1923 general election, Leicester West

1924 by-election, Westminster Abbey

1924 general election, Epping

1929 general election, Epping

1931 general election, Epping

1935 general election, Epping

1945 general election, Woodford

1950 general election, Woodford

1951 general election, Woodford

1955 general election, Woodford

1959 general election, Woodford

General elections (as leader of the Conservative Party)

1945 general election

1950 general election

1951 general election

References

Notes